Kildare Partners is a London-based private equity fund investing in distressed European real estate assets, founded by the Irish-American billionaire Ellis Short, the Chief Investment Officer.

History
Kildare Partners was founded in London in 2013 by Ellis Short, with further offices in Dublin, Ireland and Dallas, Texas, focused on real estate in western Europe. They are based at 1 Berkeley Street, Mayfair, London.

In May 2014, Deutsche Bank sold the remaining distressed assets in its €1 billion Mars portfolio of distressed German assets to Kildare Partners.

In 2018 it was announced, Kildare Partners have entered into an agreement to make a voluntary cash tender offer to acquire all shares in Technopolis, a shared workspace provider.

References

British companies established in 2013
Financial services companies based in London
Private equity firms of the United Kingdom
Companies based in the City of Westminster
Mayfair